The 2021 World Wheelchair Curling Championship (branded as the 2021 KUNTAI World Wheelchair Curling Championship for sponsorship reasons) was held October 23 to 30 at the Beijing National Aquatics Center in Beijing, China. The venue also served as the location for the curling events at the 2022 Winter Olympics.

Qualification
The following nations qualified to participate in the 2021 World Wheelchair Curling Championship:

Teams
The teams are listed as follows:

Round-robin standings
Final round-robin standings

Round-robin results
All draws times are listed in China Standard Time (UTC+08:00).

Draw 1
Saturday, October 23, 14:05

Draw 2
Saturday, October 23, 19:05

Draw 3
Sunday, October 24, 9:05

Draw 4
Sunday, October 24, 14:05

Draw 5
Sunday, October 24, 19:05

Draw 6
Monday, October 25, 9:05

Draw 7
Monday, October 25, 14:05

Draw 8
Monday, October 25, 19:05

Draw 9
Tuesday, October 26, 9:05

Draw 10
Tuesday, October 26, 14:05

Draw 11
Tuesday, October 26, 19:05

Draw 12
Wednesday, October 27, 9:05

Draw 13
Wednesday, October 27, 14:05

Draw 14
Wednesday, October 27, 19:05

Draw 15
Thursday, October 28, 9:05

Draw 16
Thursday, October 28, 14:05

Draw 17
Thursday, October 28, 19:05

Playoffs

Qualification games
Friday, October 29, 11:05

Semifinals
Friday, October 29, 16:05

Bronze medal game
Saturday, October 30, 7:05

Final
Saturday, October 30, 11:35

Final standings

See also
2020 World Wheelchair-B Curling Championship

References

External links

World Wheelchair Curling Championship
World Wheelchair Curling Championship
World Wheelchair Curling Championship
International curling competitions hosted by China
World Wheelchair Curling Championship
Sports competitions in Beijing